The 2015 American Athletic Conference baseball tournament was held at Bright House Field in Clearwater, Florida, from May 19 through 24. The event, held at the end of the conference regular season, determined the champion of the American Athletic Conference for the 2015 season.  East Carolina claimed their first tournament championship and earned the conference's automatic bid to the 2015 NCAA Division I baseball tournament.

Format and seeding
All eight baseball teams in The American were seeded based on their records in conference play. The tournament used a two bracket double-elimination format, leading to a single championship game between the winners of each bracket.

Bracket

All-Tournament Team
The following players were named to the All-Tournament Team.

Most Outstanding Player
Hunter Allen was named Tournament Most Outstanding Player.  Allen, a shortstop for East Carolina, was 9 for 18 over the course of the event, scoring 6 runs.  He was 3 for 5 and scored 2 runs in the final game.

References

Tournament
American Athletic Conference Baseball Tournament
Baseball competitions in Florida
American Athletic Conference baseball tournament
American Athletic Conference baseball tournament
College sports tournaments in Florida